The Copa Invierno 1989 was an official Chilean Cup tournament, whose purpose was to maintain clubs in activity during the 1989 Copa América and 1990 FIFA World Cup qualification (CONMEBOL) recess. The competition started on July 15, 1989, and concluded on August 15, 1989. U. Española won the competition, beating Huachipato 2–0 in the final. Played on mid-1989, the tournament was the second official cup competition of the season 1989.

Calendar

Group round

Group 1

Group 2

Group 3

Group 4

Quarterfinals

Semifinals

Final

Top goalscorer
Luis Pérez (U. Católica) 10 goals

See also
 1989 Campeonato Nacional
 1989 Copa Digeder

Sources
Revista Minuto 90 (Santiago, Chile) July–August 1989, (National Library of Chile)

Copa Chile
1989 I